The 1967 Kansas State Wildcats football team represented Kansas State University in the 1967 NCAA University Division football season. The team's head football coach was Vince Gibson.  The Wildcats played their home games in Memorial Stadium.  1967 saw the Wildcats finish with a record of 1–9, and a 0–7 record in Big Eight Conference play.  1967 was the last season that the team played at Memorial Stadium.  In 1968 the team moved to KSU Stadium.

Schedule

References

Kansas State
Kansas State Wildcats football seasons
Kansas State Wildcats football